Hont may refer to:

Places
 Hont County (archaically Honth), a historic administrative county of the Kingdom of Hungary, now in southern Slovakia and northern Hungary
 Hont, Hungary, a village in Hungary

People with the surname
 István Hont (1947–2013), Hungarian-born British historian

Other uses
 Hont (Dutch unit), an historical Dutch unit of area
 Hont-Pázmány, a gens (clan) in the Kingdom of Hungary